Per Håkan Joel Nilsson (born 11 July 1994) is a Swedish professional footballer who plays as a right wing-back or right midfielder for Hammarby IF in Allsvenskan.

Club career

Kristianstads FF
Nilsson started to play football as a youngster with local club Pukaviks IF, before moving to the youth academy of Mjällby AIF at age 16.

In 2014, Nilsson signed with Kristianstads FF in Ettan, Sweden's third tier, where he made his debut in senior football. Across two seasons with the club, Nilsson made 44 league appearances and scored 11 goals.

Mjällby AIF
On 6 January 2016, Nilsson returned to his former club Mjällby AIF, also competing in Ettan.

In 2018, he helped the team win Ettan through 21 wins in 30 games, twelve points clear of second placed Oskarshamns AIK in the table. At the end of the season, Nilsson signed a new one-year deal with Mjällby.

In 2019, Mjällby won Superettan, the domestic second tier, as newcomers, through 17 wins in 30 games, two points clear of Varbergs BoIS. After the promotion, Nilsson signed a two-year extension with Mjällby.

In 2020, Mjällby finished fifth in Allsvenskan, and Nilsson provided six assists in 24 league games. In 2021, Nilsson scored five goals and provided five assists, as the club finished 9th in the table, reportedly attracting interest from other Swedish clubs like Djurgårdens IF, IFK Göteborg, IFK Norrköping and Hammarby IF.

Hammarby IF
On 4 December 2021, Nilsson signed a two-year contract with fellow Allsvenskan club Hammarby IF, effective in January 2022.

Career statistics

Club

Honours
Mjällby AIF
 Superettan: 2019
 Ettan: 2018

References

1994 births
Living people
Swedish footballers
Association football midfielders
Mjällby AIF players
Hammarby Fotboll players
Ettan Fotboll players
Superettan players
Allsvenskan players